Carnival Celebration is the current flagship of Carnival Cruise Line. She is Carnival's second vessel of the fleet's Excel class, a subclass of Carnival Corporation & plc's Excellence class. At , she is the largest ship in Carnival's fleet. Unlike her sister ship, Mardi Gras, as well as the original Celebration, this ship is named Carnival Celebration using the Carnival prefix. Her name was announced on 21 August 2020. She was ordered on 6 November 2016 from the Finnish shipyard Meyer Turku. Construction started on 13 January 2021 and was completed on 2 November 2022.

Design and specifications 

Carnival Celebration is divided into six zones incorporating themed elements and spaces that host activities and events and also house various dining and shopping outlets. On her top decks, Carnival Celebration hosts the "Ultimate Playground" zone, where the shipboard roller coaster is located, dubbed "Bolt". "Bolt" is accompanied by an extensive water park and sports center. 

Specific to Carnival Celebration, a new zone called The Gateway features the Golden Jubilee bar and lounge. This is not only dedicated to the cruise line's 50th anniversary but also featuring both replica and original items taken from retired ships of the past, from the original Mardi Gras to Carnival Fascination. This replaces the Brass Magnolia that is featured on the her sister ship, Mardi Gras.

Area of operation 

The ship is currently operating from Miami, Florida sailing a mixture of 6-8 day cruises to the Eastern, Western and Southern Caribbean after a 14 day transatlantic cruise, which departed from Southampton, England on 6 November 2022.

References 

Carnival Corporation & plc
Carnival Cruise Lines
Ships of Carnival Cruise Line
Ships built in Finland